Modesty Blaise is a British comic strip featuring a fictional character of the same name, created by author Peter O'Donnell and illustrator Jim Holdaway in 1963. The strip follows Modesty Blaise, an exceptional young woman with many talents and a criminal past, and her trusty sidekick Willie Garvin. It was adapted into films in 1966, 1982, and 2003, and from 1965 onwards, 11 novels and two short-story collections were written.

Fictional character biography
In 1945, a nameless girl escapes from a displaced person (DP) camp in Kalyros, Greece. She remembers nothing from her short past and wanders through post-World War II Mediterranean, the Middle East, and regions of North Africa, where she learns to survive the hard way. She befriends Lob, another wandering refugee, who is a Jewish Hungarian scholar from Budapest. He gives her an education and a first name: Modesty. Sometime later, Modesty chooses her last name, Blaise, after Merlin's tutor from the Arthurian legends. When Lob dies is unclear, other than it being prior to her going to Tangier.  "The Xanadu Talisman" mentions that Modesty has left Lob at a village to recover from a wound; she goes alone to sell a car tyre. In 1953, she takes control of a criminal gang in Tangier from Henri Louche and expands it into an international organization called the Network.

During the years that she runs the Network, she meets Willie Garvin. Despite his desperate lifestyle, she sees his potential and offers him a job. Inspired by her belief in him, he pulls through as her right-hand man in the Network and becomes Modesty's most trusted friend. Theirs is a strictly platonic relationship, based on mutual respect and shared interests. He always calls her "Princess", a form of address only he is allowed to use. Other members of the Network call Modesty "Mam'selle" (as in the French term "Mademoiselle" or "Miss"). Though their relationship has no sexual element, Modesty's various lovers invariably treat Willie with frustrated envy, as he is the only man who remains vital to her life, while lovers come and go. By the same token, some of Willie's girlfriends are initially jealous of Modesty, but later come to understand how the dynamic between them works (as in the case of Lady Janet).

She obtains British nationality by marrying for convenience and divorcing an Englishman in Beirut; the husband (James Turner) dies a year later of alcoholism. Having made a point of not dealing in secrets belonging to H.M. government, when she feels she has made enough money, she retires and moves to England and Willie Garvin follows suit. Bored by their new lives among the idle rich, they accept a request for assistance from Sir Gerald Tarrant, a high-ranking official of the British Secret Service. This is where the story really begins, although it is treated differently in the first comic strip and the first book. (See note in Differences between Comic Strip and Books) Modesty's fortune is estimated at £500,000 as of 1963 (over £8.84 million in 2020). She lives in a penthouse in London overlooking Hyde Park, and also owns a villa in Tangier and a cottage two miles from Benildon, Wiltshire. She is 5 feet 6 inches (168 cm) tall and weighs 120 lb (54 kg) as revealed in La Machine.

Many of her adventures are based on capers in which Willie Garvin and she become involved as a result of their association with Tarrant. However, they may also help perfect strangers or fight various eccentric villains in exotic locations of their own volition if the cause fits their values; "ghosts" from their Network past also emerge to haunt them from time to time. Although Modesty and Willie do not hesitate to kill if necessary, they avoid deadly force whenever possible, often relying upon their extraordinary physical combat and weapons skills. There are many occasions in the comic strip and novels where the two decide ahead of time - with the final say up to Modesty - whether to use deadly force ("for keeps") or less-lethal methods ("for sleeps") depending on the level of the perceived threat. 

In Willie and Modesty's fights, great emphasis is placed on unarmed combat and unusual weapons. Modesty's weapon of choice is a kongo or yawara stick, and as for firearms she begins by preferring the Colt .32 revolver and Mab Brevete .32 ACP auto pistol, although in later books, she switches to carrying a Star PD .45 auto pistol. Willie's preferred weapon is the throwing knife, of which he usually carries two. Many other strange weapons (such as the quarterstaff, épée, blowgun, and sling) and unexpected fighting techniques are also featured.

In keeping with the "floating timeline" spirit of other long-running comic strip and literary characters, Modesty and Willie generally do not age over the decades, with Modesty always being depicted as being in her late 20s and Willie eight years older. The only exceptions to this rule occur in the comic strip origin story, "In the Beginning"; the 1996 short-story collection Cobra Trap, the final Modesty Blaise book, which contains five stories that take place where Modesty's age moves from 20 to 52 (approximately); and the 2003 film My Name Is Modesty, which is a prequel depicting Modesty in her late teens.

Comic strip
Having conceived the idea after a chance meeting with a girl during his wartime service in the Middle East, O'Donnell elected to work with Jim Holdaway, with whom he had worked on the strip Romeo Brown, after a trial period of collaboration with Frank Hampson, creator of Dan Dare, left O'Donnell dissatisfied. Modesty Blaise debuted in the London Evening Standard on 13 May 1963. The strip was syndicated among a large number of newspapers ranging from the Johannesburg Star to the Detroit Free Press, the Bombay Samachar, The Telegraph (Calcutta, India), The Star (Malaysia), The West Australian (Perth), The Evening Citizen (Glasgow, Scotland) and the Birmingham Evening Mail (Birmingham, England).

After Jim Holdaway's sudden death in 1970, the art of the strip was provided by Spanish artist Enrique Badía Romero. Eight years later, Romero quit to make time for his own comics projects, and after short attempts by John Burns and Patrick Wright, Neville Colvin drew the strip until 1986. Then Romero returned to the job and continued until the end of the strip.

The strip's circulation in the United States was erratic, in part because of the occasional nude scenes, which were much less acceptable in the US than elsewhere, resulting in a censored version of the strip being circulated. (Modesty occasionally used a tactic that she called the "Nailer," in which she appeared topless, distracting the bad guys long enough to give Willie or herself a chance to incapacitate them.) An example of this censorship appears in the introduction to the 2007 Titan Books reprint volume Death Trap, which illustrated two segments of the story arc, "The Junk Men" that were censored by the Detroit Free Press when it published the strip in 1977; in both cases a screen was drawn over scantily clad images of Willie and Modesty. Reportedly, O'Donnell did not approve of the changes, although they were made by the artist, Romero.

The final Modesty Blaise strip ran in the Evening Standard on 11 April 2001. Some of the newspapers that carried the series, feeling that it had become a tradition for their readers, began running it again from the beginning. O'Donnell, to give Romero some additional work, gave the artist permission to adapt one of his short stories ("The Dark Angels") as a comic that was published in the Scandinavian anthology magazine Agent X9 in 2002, later being reprinted in the US in a special issue of Comics Revue.

From 1 December 2008, the Evening Standard, which had stopped including comic strips for some time, republished La Machine, using the original artwork. Following a change of ownership of the paper, they did not continue with subsequent stories.

Strip numbering 
The ordinary strips are consecutive numbered from 1 to 10183. Outside this numbering are the two newspaper stories "In the Beginning" and "The Killing Ground" and the two comic-book stories "Modesty Blaise" and "The Dark Angels".

Outside the ordinary numbering is also a quantity of A-strips. An A-strip has the same number as the previous strip, but followed by an A. They were used on days when not all the newspapers running Modesty Blaise were published. An A-strip is not vital for the continuity of the story and is often just supplementing the previous strip.

The first A-strip was 194A and was published during Christmas 1963 in Scottish newspapers.

Since December 1974, The Evening Standard has not been published on Saturdays. So, since then, and the story "Cry Wolf", a sixth of the strips have been A-strips and have not had their premiere in The Evening Standard.

A single strip is numbered with an X suffix, e.g., strip number 3641X, and is similar to the A-strips.

Reprints and comic book adaptations 
Many reprint editions of the comic strip have appeared over the years, of varying quality. Most reprint the earliest strips, with strips from the 1980s and 1990s being the least often reprinted.

In Sweden the strip has been in continuous distribution since 1969 in a monthly comic adventure magazine called Agent X9 (after the existing Modesty comic magazine Agent Modesty Blaise, started in 1967, was merged with the X9 magazine). Many of O'Donnell's stories premiered here (translated into Swedish), and the magazine continues to run a Modesty Blaise story every month, from the archives.  When the daily strip was discontinued, artist Romero was given permission by O'Donnell to do a final Modesty Blaise story directly for Agent X9 magazine. The two-parter was published in 2002 and based on an unused script by O'Donnell entitled The Dark Angels, which O'Donnell had previously adapted for the short story collection Cobra Trap. Romero has for the past years also contributed with original painted covers for the Agent X9 magazine.

In India Modesty has acquired a huge fan base and the stories have been published in various magazines starting in 1971. Modesty was featured in Kalki Magazine (1971), Kumudam Magazine (1972), Muthu Comics (1975), Lion Comics (1984 to date), Rani Comics (1990–2002) & Comic World (1998) in the Tamil language. They were also published in English in Spectrum Comics (1985–1986). Though other magazines stopped/ceased publishing Modesty Blaise, Lion Comics continues to publish her stories regularly. Considering the medium, certain images from the stories were edited to make them suitable for child readers.

One of the earliest reprints in book form occurred in 1978 when Star Books—an imprint of WH Allen Limited—published two paperback-sized compilations of the Holdaway-era stories: 1) "In the Beginning", "The Black Pearl", and "The Vikings", and 2) "La Machine" and "The Long Lever". These reprints suffered from poor reproduction that rendered many panels illegible.

Between 1981 and 1986, Ken Pierce Books Inc. of the United States, in conjunction with Eclipse Comics, published eight volumes of comic book-sized reprints dubbed the First American Edition series. The first four books featured Holdaway-illustrated stories from the 1960s, while the last four featured strips from the early 1980s as illustrated by Neville Colvin. These books also suffered from reproduction problems that resulted in many panels being reprinted too light, making them difficult to read.

In 1994, DC Comics released a graphic novel adaptation of Modesty Blaise (the novel), with art by Dan Spiegle and Dick Giordano.

Manuscript Press published two volumes of late-1980s Romero strips in 2003 (Live Bait and Lady in the Dark); it also published all of the stories not reprinted elsewhere in serialised form in its magazine publications Comics Revue and Modesty Blaise Quarterly, the former of which, as noted above, also published The Dark Angels for the first (and, to date, only) time in English. Comics Revue is continuing to reprint Modesty Blaise strips as of 2015, although a planned reprint of The Dark Angels in autumn 2014 was cancelled just before publication when the copyright holders withdrew permission.

The American magazine Comics Revue also continues to reprint the strip, and remains to date the only publisher to have released an English-language version of The Dark Angels.

Titan Books old series, 1985–1990 
Between 1984 and 1990, Titan Books of England published eight volumes of reprints of strips featuring art by Holdaway and Romero, covering the period 1963 to 1974. All of the covers were drawn by John M. Burns.

Titan Books new series, 2004–2017 
Beginning in March 2004, Titan launched a new series of reprint volumes. These new versions use larger images and reportedly come from better source material than the editions published between 1984 and 1990.

As well as an introduction to each story by Peter O'Donnell (books 1 to 16), Lawrence Blackmore (books 17 to 24), Simon Ward (book 25), Rick Norwood (book 26), Rebecca Chance (book 28), and Daphne Alexander and Kate McAll (book 30), most books include articles about the series. The individual story introductions are absent from books 27 and 29.

In October 2017, Titan completed its reprints of the entire newspaper strip run with the final stories from Romero's second tenure. It is not yet known if the company has the rights to reprint "The Dark Angels", a graphic novel-length story that was published in a European magazine after the retirement of the original strip, or the 1994 graphic novel adaptation of the first Modesty Blaise novel published by DC Comics.

Story list
There were 99 storylines produced for the Modesty Blaise comic strip and all its printed forms over almost forty years, and every story was written solely by Peter O'Donnell. The strips and comic books were drawn by Jim Holdaway (JH), Enrique Badia Romero (ER), John M. Burns (JB), Patrick Wright (PW), Neville Colvin (NC), Dan Spiegle (DS) and Dick Giordano (DG).

Sources: 
A  (Comics Revue Annual),
C  (Comics Revue),
CM  (Comic Media Vol 2, No. 2),
CS  (Comics Revue Special),
F#  (First American Edition Series, Ken Pierce),
LB  (Live Bait, Manuscript Press),
LD  (Lady in the Dark, Manuscript Press),
MB  (Comics Revue Presents Modesty Blaise),
S#  (Star Books paperback reprints, 1978),
OT#  (Titan Books, old series (1984–90)),
T#  (Titan Books, new series (2004–2017)).

Differences between comic strip and books
Although the books generally reflect the characters previously established in the comic strip, there are a number of detail differences. One example of this is how Modesty is initially recruited to work for Sir Gerald Tarrant – although the strip story La Machine (1963) and the book story Modesty Blaise (1965) have similarities, and in both Tarrant achieves his aim by putting her under an obligation, in the strip story this relates to the validity of her marriage (and therefore her right to British nationality and residence) while in the book he provides her with information that enables her to rescue Willie Garvin and save his life. The name of her husband is given in the strip, with the marriage taking place in 1960 and him dying in 1961; in the novel he is unnamed and the marriage took place in 1962. The novels also include a more overt fantasy element than the strip, with characters demonstrating clairvoyant abilities in several novels (including Willie's trademark ability to predict trouble when he feels his ears prickling, a trait also demonstrated in the comic), and a later story referencing the afterlife.

There are also cases where characters first appear in the books and then subsequently appear in the comic strip – Steve Collier first appears in I, Lucifer (1967) and his future wife Dinah in A Taste for Death (1969) but they do not appear in the strip until Lady in the Dark (1989).

Modesty Blaise Quarterly

Comics Revue presents Modesty Blaise was a small press magazine sized comic book published by Manuscript Press which reprinted Modesty Blaise comic strip stories by O'Donnell and illustrated by the artists Jim Holdaway (JH), Enrique Badia Romero (ER), John M. Burns (JB), Patrick Wright (PW), Neville Colvin (NC).  It published 25 issues between 1995 and 2000.  With issue 23, all the MB stories had been reprinted in either Comics Revue presents Modesty Blaise or Comics Revue, so the contents of the last two issues was decided by reader vote.  Issue 24 carried "The Galley Slaves" and 25 reprinted "Butch Cassidy Rides Again".

In other media

Films
After the initial popularity of the comic strip British Lion Films announced a Modesty Blaise film to be written by Sidney Gilliat that was never made.

A film titled Modesty Blaise, loosely based on the comic strip, was filmed in 1966 as a comedy thriller. It was directed by Joseph Losey and starred Monica Vitti as Modesty, Terence Stamp as Willie Garvin, and Dirk Bogarde as Gabriel. Peter O'Donnell wrote the first draft of the screenplay for the film, but the script was heavily revised by others before shooting began, and the finished film bore very little resemblance to O'Donnell's vision in tone, theme, or characterisation. For example, a romance is established between Willie and Modesty, even though the comic strip firmly established only a platonic relationship between them. The film also incorporated several musical numbers. One sequence of the film establishes that the Modesty Blaise comic strip exists within the fictional universe of the film and is based upon the exploits of Vitti's character, who is seen dressing up as the illustrated version of herself. The film was unsuccessful.

In 1982, a one-hour pilot was made for a proposed Modesty Blaise television series, starring Ann Turkel as Modesty Blaise and Lewis Van Bergen as Willie Garvin. The film aired on the ABC Network to positive reviews, but no series resulted. This was a slightly more serious version of the stories than the campy 1966 comedy version. In this pilot the setting is moved from London to Hollywood, and both Willie and Tarrant are portrayed as Americans; Modesty's nationality is left unrevealed but Turkel also plays her with an American accent.

In 2003, a direct-to-video film titled My Name Is Modesty was released under the "Quentin Tarantino Presents..." banner. The film was directed by Scott Spiegel and starred English actress Alexandra Staden as Modesty Blaise (to date the only British actress to play the role on screen). Although promoted as the first of a series, no others were made. One immediately noticeable difference between the film and the source material is that it is a prequel to Modesty's established backstory as a crime boss; as such, the character of Willie Garvin is omitted.

Quentin Tarantino has been interested in directing a Modesty Blaise film for many years, and at one point Neil Gaiman wrote a script treatment based upon O'Donnell's novel, I, Lucifer. So far, nothing has come of these plans. Tarantino "sponsored" the release of My Name Is Modesty by allowing it to be released under the label "Quentin Tarantino presents ..." In the Tarantino film Pulp Fiction, Vincent Vega is seen reading a copy of Modesty Blaise.
Nicole Kidman has also gone on record as being interested in making a Modesty Blaise film, and Jennifer Lopez was reported to be pitching for the part in 2003.

Novels and short story collections
O'Donnell was invited to write a novelization of the 1966 film. The novel, released a year before the film itself and based on his original screenplay for the movie, fared considerably better than the film. During the following decades he would write a total of eleven Modesty Blaise novels and two collections of short stories. Several of the short stories either adapt comic strip stories, or would later be adapted into comic strip stories themselves. Characters cross over between the two media. Except for Pieces of Modesty, initially published as a Pan Books paperback, the books were originally issued in hardback (by Souvenir Press) and have subsequently gone through numerous paperback editions, with Pan the primary paperback publisher in the U.K. until the late 1970s.

O'Donnell's final book, Cobra Trap, is a short story collection. Intended by O'Donnell to be his literary finale, the final story depicts the deaths of Modesty and Willie (with an implied afterlife). O'Donnell, however, would continue to write the comic strip for several more years, and chose to end it on a more optimistic note, though the comic strip's finale does not contradict the prose version.

Beginning in the early 2000s (decade), Souvenir Press began a series of paperback reprints of the Modesty Blaise book series, using the first edition hardback covers, and originally concluding with a reprint of Cobra Trap in 2006. Souvenir subsequently gained the rights to the short story collection Pieces of Modesty and issued their reprint of that book in March 2010, with a new cover design based on the original hardback cover from the first Modesty novel, at which point all the Blaise books fell under the same UK publisher for the first time.

In 2008, Penguin Books of India reprinted the full series.

The 2012 Charles Stross book The Apocalypse Codex is, according to the author, a tribute to Modesty Blaise.

Audio formats
Last Day in Limbo was adapted as a BBC World Service six-part radio drama in 1978 with Barbara Kellerman as Modesty, James Bolam as Willie and Richard Vernon as Tarrant.

I Had a Date with Lady Janet (the short story from Pieces of Modesty) was published as an audio tape reading by Pickwick Talking Books in the early 1980s, featuring John Thaw as Willie (the story, uniquely to the canon, is a first-person tale told from Willie Garvin's point of view).

BBC Radio 4 has broadcast adaptations of three of the books in their "15 Minute Drama" slot, each in five fifteen-minute episodes, adapted by Stef Penney and produced/directed by Kate McAll, starring Daphne Alexander as Modesty, with music by Will Gregory, arranged by Ian Gardiner.

A Taste for Death was originally broadcast from 17 to 21 December 2012, featuring Carl Prekopp as Willie and Alun Armstrong as Tarrant, with Sam Dale (Simon Delicata), Geoffrey Streatfeild (Steve Collier), Samantha Dakin (Dinah Pilgrim), Alex Fearns (McWhirter), Jeff Mash (Skeet Lowery) and Nigel Anthony (Sir Howard Presteign).

Modesty Blaise  was originally broadcast from 16 to 20 June 2014, featuring Neil Maskell as Willie and Alun Armstrong as Tarrant, with Ewan Bailey (Gabriel), Alex Fearns (McWhirter), Matthew Gravelle, John Hollingworth and Hannah Pakeman.

The Silver Mistress was originally broadcast from 13 to 17 February 2017, featuring Paul Bazely as Willie and Ian McNeice as Tarrant, with Clare Grogan (Clare), Ewan Bailey (Sexton/Colonel Jim), Sara Markland (Lady Janet/Angel) and John Ramm (Quinn).

References to Modesty Blaise in other popular culture 
 The theme song "Modesty (Modesty Blaise Theme)" from the Losey movie was sung by David and Jonathan, with music composed by John Dankworth and lyrics by Benny Green. This appeared on the soundtrack album issued by 20th Century Fox (S 4182) and also as a single on the Fontana label. The album was released on CD by Harkit (HRKCD 8003) in 2001.
 Rock group Sparks wrote and recorded a song intended as the theme tune for the aborted TV series. Using an amended title "Modesty Plays" to avoid trademark infringement, it was released originally in 1982 as a France-only single and subsequently in a new version on their 1986 album Music That You Can Dance To. Singer Russell Mael admits that he is actually singing "Blaise" not "Plays".
 Closterkeller, a Polish Gothic band, recorded the song "Modesty Blaise" on their 1992 album Blue, based on the Modesty Blaise character.
 The concept of the 1992 album Modesty by the Yugoslav pop rock band Bel Tempo was inspired by the Modesty Blaise character.
 Montt Mardié from Sweden opens his 2005 debut album Drama with a song entitled "Modesty Blaise".
 British group the Direct Hits released their 4-track EP The Modesty Blaise Sessions on The Forbidden Label in 1986. The first track, "Modesty Blaise", alludes to the character, especially in her comic-strip form.
 In the Quentin Tarantino film Pulp Fiction, hit-man Vincent Vega is twice seen reading the first US printing of the Modesty Blaise novel while seated on the toilet.
 A thinly disguised pair - Persephone Hazard and her companion Johnny McTavish - are in some of Charlie Stross' Laundry series books. She is a witch, he calls her Duchess, they work as external assets of an occult department of the British secret services.

Controversy 
On 29 June 2020 strip no. 2548 drew controversy from readers of The West Australian newspaper for its dialogue, in which the villain in the story used offensive language to refer to Indigenous Australians. Strip no. 2548 and the associated story "The Stone Age Caper", has a villain who makes racist statements. The story had previously been published by the newspaper in 2009. At that time, the only complaint about the story was that in one panel Modesty is shown topless. On 30 June 2020 the newspaper made a decision that, after 48 years, it would cease publishing Modesty Blaise.

Notes

References

 The Complete Modesty Blaise Dossier
 Modesty Blaise book bibliography

External links
 The Grand Comics Database
 Kristy Valenti's three-part article on Peter O'Donnell – Part one, Part Two and Part Three at comiXology
 Kent Hedlundh's Modesty Blaise site (interviews with Peter O'Donnell, lists of all the comic strip stories, etc.)
 The Modesty Blaise Book Covers Site (information on the books, with graphics of the many different printings)

Adult comic strips
Eclipse Comics titles
Titan Books titles
DC Comics titles
Blaise, Modesty
Novel series
Blaise, Modesty
Drama comics
Crime comics
Spy comics
British comic strips
Comics about women
Blaise, Modesty
1963 comics debuts
2002 comics endings
Blaise, Modesty
Blaise, Modesty
Modesty Blaise
Blaise, Modesty
Comedy film characters
Comics adapted into radio series
British comics adapted into films
Comics adapted into novels
Fictional people from the 20th-century